Nuclear Fatwa Under International Law is a Juridical book written by Jaber Seyvanizad, and was published by the American publication "Supreme Century" in 2017. The chief subject of  "Nuclear Fatwa Under International Law" book is concerning "Determining the legal status and dimensions of the Supreme Leader's nuclear-fatwa" through international-law. Based on the fatwa (Islamic ruling) of the Supreme Leader of the Islamic Republic of Iran Seyyed Ali Khamenei, the utilization of nuclear weapons is forbidden.

At the book of "Nuclear Fatwa Under International Law", there are some items which have a central role in the "conceptual geometry" of the book, namely: referring to the "rulings of the International Court of Justice"; resolutions of the United Nations Commission on International Law; and the rules governing the formation of custom" in international law.

See also 
 Ali Khamenei's fatwa against nuclear weapons
 Ali Khamenei bibliography

References 

Politics of Iran
Nuclear energy in Iran
Nuclear program of Iran
Ali Khamenei